A constitutional referendum was held in Togo on 27 September 1992. The changes to the constitution would restore multi-party democracy and were approved by 99.17% of voters with a 74.2% turnout.

Results

References

1992 referendums
1992 in Togo
1992
Constitutional referendums
September 1992 events in Africa